|}
{| class="collapsible collapsed" cellpadding="0" cellspacing="0" style="clear:right; float:right; text-align:center; font-weight:bold;" width="280px"
! colspan="3" style="border:1px solid black; background-color: #77DD77;" | Also Ran

The 1982 Epsom Derby was the 203rd annual running of the Derby horse race. It took place at Epsom Downs Racecourse on 2 June 1982.

The race was won by Robert Sangster's Golden Fleece, at odds of 3/1 ridden by jockey Pat Eddery and trained at Ballydoyle by Vincent O'Brien. Golden Fleece's win was the sixth in the race for O'Brien and the second for Eddery. The winning time of 2:34.27 was the fastest since Mahmoud's hand-timed 2:33.8 in 1936.

Race details
 Sponsor: none
 Winner's prize money: £146,720
 Going: Firm
 Number of runners: 18
 Winner's time: 2 minutes, 34.27 seconds

Full result

Winner details
Further details of the winner, Golden Fleece:

 Foaled: 1 April 1979, in the United States
 Sire: Nijinsky; Dam: Exotic Treat (Vaguely Noble)
 Owner: Robert Sangster
 Breeder: Mr & Mrs Paul Hexter

Form analysis

Two-year-old races
Notable runs by the future Derby participants as two-year-olds in 1981:
 Count Pahlen – 3rd in Acomb Stakes, 1st in William Hill Futurity
 Jalmood – 3rd in William Hill Futurity
 Lobkowiez – 3rd in Royal Lodge Stakes
 Norwick – 1st in Royal Lodge Stakes, 2nd in Grand Critérium
 Persepolis – 1st in Prix La Rochette
 Silver Hawk – 1st in Solario Stakes, 2nd in Royal Lodge Stakes
 Wongchoi – 2nd in Somerville Tattersall Stakes

The road to Epsom
Early-season appearances in 1982 and trial races prior to running in the Derby:
 Count Pahlen – 1st in Blue Riband Trial Stakes
 Father Rooney – 2nd in Chester Vase
 Golden Fleece – 1st in Nijinsky Stakes, 1st in Ballymoss Stakes
 Jalmood – 3rd in Sandown Classic Trial, 1st in Lingfield Derby Trial
 Lobkowiez – 3rd in Chester Vase
 Palace Gold – 2nd in Dante Stakes
 Peacetime – 1st in Sandown Classic Trial, 1st in Predominate Stakes
 Persepolis – 1st in Prix Noailles, 1st in Prix Lupin
 Silver Hawk – 1st in Craven Stakes
 Super Sunrise – 1st in Chester Vase
 Touching Wood – 2nd in Predominate Stakes
 Wongchoi – 3rd in Craven Stakes

Subsequent Group 1 wins
Group 1 / Grade I victories after running in the Derby.

Jalmood – Premio Presidente della Repubblica (1983)Touching Wood – St Leger (1982), Irish St Leger (1982)

Subsequent breeding careers

Leading progeny of participants in the 1982 Epsom Derby.

Sires of Classic winners
Silver Hawk (3rd) 
 Benny The Dip – 1st Epsom Derby (1997)
 Mutafaweq – 1st St Leger Stakes (1999)
 Lady In Silver – 1st Prix de Diane (1989)
 Magnificient Style – 1st Musidora Stakes (1996) Dam of Nathaniel, Great Heavens, Playful Act, Echoes In Eternity and Percussionist

Sires of Group/Grade One winners
Touching Wood (2nd)
 Ashal – 1st Ascot Gold Cup (1990)
 Linesman – 1st Sydney Cup (1997)
 Jeewan – Dam of Borderlescott
 Jadidh – Dam of Sergeant Cecil

Sires of National Hunt horses
Florida Son (18th)
 Florida Pearl – Winner of 9 Grade 1 chases including Irish Hennessy (1999, 2000, 2001, 2004), King George VI Chase (2001) Punchestown Gold Cup (2002)
 Florida Coast – 2nd Hatton's Grace Hurdle (2003)
Norwick (5th)
 Hebridean – 1st Long Walk Hurdle (1994)
 Star Traveller – 3rd National Hunt Handicap Chase (2001)

Other Stallions
Golden Fleece (1st) – Pixie Erin (1st 1987 Matron Stakes), King's College (2nd 1987 Tetrarch Stakes), Gold Bracelet (Dam of Lake Kariba)Jalmood (14th) – Lord Of The Field (3rd 1993 Irish Champion Stakes), Jaljuli (3rd 1988 Cheveley Park Stakes), Jacamar (1st 1988 Chesham Stakes) – Exported to Sweden Persepolis (4th) – Harlem Shuffle (2nd 1987 Prix Noailles), Sarba (3rd 1988 Prix de Royallieu)Count Pahlen (9th) – Thunder Grey (3rd 1992 Prix Gladiateur)Super Sunrise (12th) – Exported to America before returning to Great Britain where he produced a winner of a Kelso Novices' HurdlePeacetime (7th) – Exported to South AfricaRocamadour (8th) – Exported to AmericaFather Rooney (13th) – Exported to South AfricaReef Glade (16th) – Exported to Japan

References

External links
 Colour Chart – Derby 1982

Epsom Derby
Epsom Derby
Epsom Derby
Epsom Derby
 1982
20th century in Surrey